Easyway is a Portuguese punk rock band founded in 2000. They have released three albums.

History 
In 2001, Easyway, made a seven track demo, via this and live performances the band grew in the Portuguese underground scene.
At the end of Summer 2001 the original drummer, Rodrigo, was replaced with Danilo Warick (who previously played in a metal band called Sacred Sin).

They began work on a first album, Forever In A Day in 2003 (in Lisbon). After the recording the guitar player, Miguel Marques, went to Los Angeles to mix the album. The album was produced by Cameron Webb (who previously worked with Limp Bizkit, Staring Back, Social Distortion and Danzig).

Discography 
 Forever In A Day - 2004
 Can You Keep A Secret? - 2006
 Laudamus Vita CD+DVD - 2010

References

Portuguese punk rock groups